Alexis Antonio Mendoza Barrina (born November 8, 1961) is a retired Colombian footballer and current manager. 

He was the assistant manager of Honduras national football team during the 2010 FIFA World Cup and of the Ecuador national football team during the 2014 FIFA World Cup. Mendoza was capped 67 times and scored 2 international goals for Colombia between 1987 and 1997.

International career
Mendoza played one match at the 1994 World Cup, and was an unused substitute for the 1990 World Cup. Mendoza also played in 4 editions of the Copa América in 1987, 1989, 1993 and 1995

Club career
Mendoza played most of his club career for Atlético Junior. He also played for América de Cali between 1990 and 1992, where he won two Colombian league championships (1990 & 1992).

In 1993, he returned to Junior and helped them to win the 1993 and 1995 Colombian league championships.

Towards the end of his career Mendoza played for Veracruz in Mexico.

Honours

Player

Club
 América de Cali
 Colombian League: 1990, 1992
 Atlético Junior
 Colombian League: 1993, 1995

Manager
 Atlético Junior
 Copa Colombia: 2015

References

External links
 
 
 
 
 Alexis Mendoza at Footballdatabase

1961 births
Living people
Colombian footballers
Colombian expatriate footballers
Colombia international footballers
Atlético Junior footballers
América de Cali footballers
C.D. Veracruz footballers
Categoría Primera A players
Liga MX players
Expatriate footballers in Argentina
Expatriate footballers in Mexico
1990 FIFA World Cup players
1994 FIFA World Cup players
1987 Copa América players
1989 Copa América players
1993 Copa América players
1995 Copa América players
C.S.D. Independiente del Valle managers
Association football defenders
Colombian football managers
Footballers from Barranquilla